() or Route 22 is a short national road on the island of Heimaey in the Southern Region of Iceland. It runs from Básaskersbryggja, through the town of Vestmannaeyjar up to Vestmannaeyjar Airport.

References

Roads in Iceland